Auriscalpium gilbertsonii is a species of fungus in the family Auriscalpiaceae of the Russulales order. Found in Costa Rica, it was described as new to science by Norwegian mycologist Leif Ryvarden in 2001.

References

External links

Fungi described in 2001
Fungi of Central America
Russulales
Taxa named by Leif Ryvarden